The 2007 Major League Lacrosse season was the seventh season of the league.  The season began on May 12 and concluded with the championship game on August 26, 2007.

General information
In November 2006, the Baltimore Bayhawks relocated to Washington, D.C. and became the Washington Bayhawks. They played 5 of their 6 games at Multi-Sport Field and 1 at George Mason Stadium.

New venues in 2007
The Boston Cannons moved their home games to Harvard Stadium.
The Chicago Machine moved their home games to Toyota Park.
The Philadelphia Barrage moved their home games to United Sports Training Center

New rules in 2007:
 Created the same stick dimension requirements as NCAA. 
 Enforce “pull-strings” as making a stick illegally altered and thus cannot re-enter the game.

Chicago won for the first time in franchise history on June 2 defeating Denver.  The Machine had lost a league record 13 consecutive games (including all 12 games in 2006).

The 2007 season was a record breaking season:
 On June 16, the Rochester Rattlers  won a 27–26 (in overtime) game over the Denver Outlaws in the highest scoring game in MLL history at INVESCO Field at Mile High the teams combined for a total 53 goals.
 A MLL record crowd of 19,793 watched the July 4 game between Chicago and Denver at INVESCO Field at Mile High. The previous mark  was 15,981, set by a Los Angeles at Denver game in 2006.
 John Grant, Jr. broke the league's single-season points record with 71 points, while Spencer Ford set the single-season assists record 47.

Regular season
W = Wins, L = Losses, PCT = Winning Percentage, GF = Goals For, 2ptGF = 2 point Goals For, GA = Goals Against, 2ptGA = 2 point Goals Against

Philadelphia finished first in the East over Rochester based on a better conference record (8–2 vs. 7–3).

Boston finished 3rd in the East based on combine record against Long Island and Washington: 3–1 (2–0 against Washington, and 1–1 against Long Island).  Long Island finished 4th based on combine record against Boston and Washington: 2–2 (1–1 against Washington 1–1 against Boston) and Washington finished 5th based on combine record against Boston and Long Island: 1–3 (1–1 against Long Island and 0–2 against Boston).

All Star Game
July 8 at Harvard Stadium in Boston
Eastern Conference All Stars 19–12 Western Conference All Stars
MVP Matt Poskay (Boston) for the Eastern Conference

Playoffs
The 2007 NB Zip Major League Lacrosse Championship Weekend took place August 25–26 at PAETEC Park in Rochester, New York

Semi-finals
August 25 @PAETEC Park, Rochester, New York
Philadelphia 13–12(OT) Denver
Los Angeles 15–14 Rochester

Championship 
August 27@PAETEC Park, Rochester, New York
Philadelphia 16–13 Los Angeles

Bracket

MVP: Matt Striebel (Philadelphia)

Awards

References

7
Major League Lacrosse